Melle is Indian Malayalam romantic film written and directed by Binu P. Ulahannan. The film is produced by Triyega productions and stars Amith Chakalakkal and Thanuja Karthik in lead roles with Joju George, Joy Mathew, P. Balachandran, Vivek Bhaskar Haridas in supporting roles. Cinematography is done by Santhosh Anima, editing by Sunesh Sebastian, music by Donald Mathew and Vijay Jacob, film score by Vijay Jacob. Film is produced by Johny C. David under the banner of Triyega Productions. Muzik 247 is the music label.

Cast 
 Amith Chakalakkal as Dr.Reji
 Thanuja Karthik as Uma 
 Joju George
 Joy Mathew
 P. Balachandran
 Karthik Vishnu
 Vivek Bhaskar Haridas
 Krishnaprabha

Production 
Melle is directed by Binu Ulahannan and produced by Johny C. David. Starring Joju George, Joy Mathew, P. Balachandran, Vivek Bhaskar, Haridas, Krishnaprabha, Meenakshi Rameshbabu, Ambika Mohan, Haris Beegam.

Music 
The music of the film was composed by Donald Mathew and Vijay Jacob. Soundtrack consists four tracks. The track "Hridayam" is sung by the singer Vijay Yesudas and another song "Konji Konji Pookum" was sung by Shweta Mohan.

Release 
Melle released in theaters on 20 October 2017.

References

External links 
 

2017 films
2010s Malayalam-language films
2017 directorial debut films